The Horses of Helios, also known as The Four Bronze Horses of Helios, is a bronze sculpture of four horses by Rudy Weller.  It is one half of a commission installed in 1992 when the adjacent Criterion Theatre was refurbished.  The other half, the Daughters of Helios or Three Graces, is a sculpture of three women leaping off the building six stories above.

The Horses of Helios comprises three bronze elements with dark patina: one pair of horses weighing approximately 4 tons, and two single horses.  The four rearing horses appear to be bursting from the water of a fountain.  It depicts Aethon, Eous, Phlegon, and Pyrois - the four horses of Helios, Greek god of the sun.

The sculpture was installed in 1991 in a fountain under a canopy at the base of the building at 1 Jermyn Street, on the corner where Piccadilly meets Haymarket, near Piccadilly Circus in London.  The building is adjacent to the Criterion Theatre, and was installed when the theatre was refurbished.

The Daughters of Helios or  Three Graces depicts the three Charites - Aglaea, Euphrosyne, and Thalia - who in some accounts are the daughters of Helios and the naiad Aegle.  The three female figures are made from gold-leaf-covered aluminium.  They are installed at roof level, as if leaping off the 6th floor of the building immediately above the horses below.

, since at least December 2020, the sculpture is behind a security fence and the fountain is not operating.

References

 Piccadilly Circus, Secret London

External links

 In pictures: MadforArts: Horses of Helios, BBC News
 Horses of Helios, Vanguard Holdings
 Criterion Theatre: Piccadilly Circus, London's Theatres (2002), pg. 34
 Criterion complex, Piccadilly Circus, Ornamental Passions
 I looked up, Today I Am Happy That…
The sculpture in 2022 from Googe Streetview

1992 establishments in England
1992 sculptures
Animal sculptures in the United Kingdom
Bronze sculptures in the United Kingdom
Horses in art
Outdoor sculptures in London
Sculptures of classical mythology
Statues in London
City of Westminster